David Arthur Skeel, Jr. (born September 10, 1961) is an American law professor specializing in bankruptcy law and corporate law. He is the S. Samuel Arsht Professor of Corporate Law at the University of Pennsylvania Law School, a position he has held since 2004.

Biography
Skeel received a B.A. from the University of North Carolina at Chapel Hill and a J.D. from the University of Virginia School of Law. From 1987 to 1988, he clerked for the Honorable Walter K. Stapleton of the United States Court of Appeals for the Third Circuit.

From 1988 to 1990, he was an associate in the law firm Duane, Morris, and Heckscher, within the firm's reorganization and finance department. From 1990 to 1998, Skeel taught at Temple University School of Law, where he was an associate professor from 1993 to 1998 and an assistant professor from 1990 to 1993.

Skeel joined the University of Pennsylvania Law School in 1999. He specializes in corporate law, and is the S. Samuel Arsht Professor of Corporate Law, a position he has held since 2004. He has won the Lindback Award (2004), the Harvey Levin Award for Excellence in Teaching (1999, 2002 & 2011), and the Robert A. Gorman Award (2010).

In 2016, he was named to the PROMESA oversight board in charge of resolving the Puerto Rican government-debt crisis.

Publications
2014. True Paradox: How Christianity Makes Sense of Our Complex World. InterVarsity Press
2011. The New Financial Deal: Understanding the Dodd-Frank Act and its (Unintended) Consequences
2006. Icarus in the Boardroom: The Fundamental Flaws in Corporate America and Where They Came From. Oxford UP
2001. Debt’s Dominion: A History of Bankruptcy Law in America. Princeton UP

References

External links
Penn Law page for David Skeel with link to Curriculum Vitae

Living people
University of North Carolina at Chapel Hill alumni
University of Pennsylvania Law School faculty
University of Virginia School of Law alumni
1961 births